Cell Phone is a 2003 Chinese comedy-drama film directed by Feng Xiaogang and starring Ge You, Zhang Guoli, Xu Fan and Fan Bingbing. It was first released on 18 December 2003 in mainland China and was subsequently screened at the Cleveland International Film Festival on 18 March 2005. With box office earnings of over ¥50 million, Cell Phone became the highest-grossing domestic film in 2003.

Written by Liu Zhenyun, based on his own novel of the same title, the film revolves around two successful men whose marriages were wrecked when their wives uncovered their extramarital affairs through traces left in their cell phones. More broadly, the film explores the role of cellphones in interpersonal complex relationships in modern China, where rapidly expanding use of information technology impacts the way people communicate.

Plot
Yan Shouyi is a TV host who has an affair with Wu Yue (Fan Bingbing), a young and attractive woman working in publishing. Yan diligently erases all text messages and call records between him and Wu on his cellphone before he gets home everyday, in order to avoid detection by his wife Yu Wenjuan (Lu Zhang). One night, after telling Yu that he has a work meeting with Fei Mo (Zhang Guoli), a TV producer and Yan's superior, Yan rendezvous with Wu and switches off his cellphone. Not being able to reach Yan a while later, Yu calls Fei, who has been in the know of Yan's affair.

Cast
 Ge You as Yan Shouyi (S: 严守一, T: 嚴守一, P: Yán Shǒuyī), a TV host
 Zhang Guoli as Fei Mo (S: 费墨, T: 費墨, P: Fèi Mò), a TV producer, Yan's superior
 Xu Fan as Shen Xue (C: 沈雪, P: Shěn Xuě), a teacher at an arts academy, Yan's lover after his divorce with his wife
 Fan Bingbing as Wu Yue (C: 武月, P: Wǔ Yuè), a young attractive woman working in publishing who has an affair with Yan
 Lu Zhang as Yu Wenjuan (S: 于文娟, T: 於文娟, P: Yú Wénjuān), Yan's wife who divorces him when she discovers his affair with Wu
 Zhao Kulier as Li Yan
 Huang Suying as Yan's Grandmother
 Yang Xin as Lu Gui Hua / Niu Cai Yun
 Yong Mei as Xiao Su

Reception
The popularity of Cell Phone among the cinema-goers is evident in its strong box office performance. Having achieved ¥50 million in box office within a month after release, the film became the best-selling domestic production in 2003.

The film also clinched all three top awards at the 2004 Hundred Flowers Awards, which is based on viewer voting. However, it failed to bag any award or even acquire nomination for any of the major awards at the jury-based Golden Rooster Awards in the same year. According to Golden Rooster's leading juror Zhong Chengxiang, albeit being popular among viewers, Cell Phone lacked "class and style". Producer Wang Zhongjun retorted that viewers' approval is of the utmost importance and rejected the Golden Rooster as an award that has "not a single bit of commercial driving force". On the other hand, the official Huabiao Awards gave out an unprecedented special award to Cell Phone for its achievements in "market development", signifying official recognition of the market forces and taste of the masses.

Television presenter Cui Yongyuan was reported to be unhappy by the film, claiming that director Feng Xiaogang wanted to make a film about a retiring television host based on him.

Accolades
 Huabiao Awards, 2004
 Market Development Award
 Best Film (nominated)
 Best New Actress (nominated) — Fan Bingbing
 Golden Rooster Awards, 2004
 Best Supporting Actor (nominated) — Zhang Guoli
 Best Supporting Actress (nominated) — Fan Bingbing
 Best Cinematography (nominated)
 Best Art Direction (nominated)
 Hundred Flowers Awards, 2004
 Best Film
 Best Actor — Ge You
 Best Actor (nominated) — Zhang Guoli
 Best Actress — Fan Bingbing
 Best Actress (nominated) — Xu Fan

References

External links
 
 

2003 films
2003 comedy-drama films
Chinese comedy-drama films
Chinese New Year films
Films directed by Feng Xiaogang
Films set in Beijing
Films with screenplays by Liu Zhenyun
Huayi Brothers films
2000s Mandarin-language films